The River Stour is a  river which flows through Wiltshire and Dorset in southern England, and drains into the English Channel.

Toponymy
It is sometimes called the Dorset Stour to distinguish it from other rivers of the same name in Kent, Suffolk and the Midlands. According to Brewer's Dictionary of Britain & Ireland, the name Stour rhymes with hour and derives from Old English meaning "violent", "fierce" or the "fierce one".

History 
The river burst its banks at Christchurch during the 2013–14 winter floods and 100 residents were evacuated.

Prehistoric archaeology 
The Stour valley has produced rich evidence for early human (Palaeolithic) activity. Gravel pits in the lower reaches of the river (many underlying modern day Bournemouth) produced hundreds of Lower Palaeolithic handaxes when they were quarried, particular during the late 19th century and the first half of the 20th century. Archaeological investigations around 2010 near Corfe Mullen suggested that some of the artefacts from those quarries may be around 400,000 to 500,000 years old.

Course
The source of the river is fed from greensand springs at Stourhead, in Wiltshire, where it forms a series of artificial lakes which are part of the Stourhead estate owned by the National Trust. It flows south into Dorset through the Blackmore Vale and the towns of Gillingham and Sturminster Newton.

At Marnhull the Stour is joined by the River Cale and then (two miles downstream) by the River Lydden. At Blandford Forum the river breaks through the chalk ridge of the Dorset Downs, and from there flows south east into the heathlands of south east Dorset.  At Wimborne Minster it is joined by the River Allen, and at its estuary at Christchurch it is joined by the River Avon before it flows through the harbour into the English Channel.

For many miles the river is followed by the route of the now disused Somerset and Dorset Joint Railway, which bridged the river four times in a  section between Sturminster Newton and Blandford Forum.

Because much of the river's course is across clay soil, the river's waterlevel varies greatly. In summer, low water level makes the river a diverse and important habitat, supporting many rare plants. In winter, the river often floods, and is therefore bordered by wide and fertile flood plains.

A number of towns and villages in Dorset are named after the river, including East Stour, West Stour, Stourpaine, Stourton Caundle, Stour Row, Stour Provost, Sturminster Newton, and Sturminster Marshall. Sturminster Newton is famous for its water mill and town bridge, which still bears the notice warning potential vandals that damaging the bridge is punishable by penal transportation.

Ecology
The river flows through a myriad of differing settings and scenery (reed bed, open water, coastal, estuarine, river, streams, lowland heath) and as such is host to species such as the pipistrelle bat, harbour porpoise, great crested newt, medicinal leech, Desmoulin's whorl snail and the starlet sea anemone.

There are many fish that live and use the river, which include; barbel, bream, chub, dace, grayling, perch, pike, roach, rudd, salmon, tench & trout. The harbour at Christchurch has also been used to land oysters, crab, lobster and cuttlefish, all of which were fished from the harbour itself. Bass and mullet are known to use the estuary for feeding and as a nursery.

Downstream of Blandford Forum, the Stour is host to an insect known as the Blandford Fly (simulium posticatum) which is known for leaving painful bites on humans. Attempts have been made to rid the fly from the area with a special spray used on the larval habitats of the fly.

Recreation and amenity
The harbour at Christchurch and the lower reaches of the Stour and the Avon are host to a multitude of marinas, boat clubs and landing stages. Boats can be hired from several yards and landings in the harbour and estuary area with kayaking and canoeing being popular on the river too.

The Stour Valley Way is a designated long-distance footpath that follows almost all of the course of the river.

White Mill, an 18th-century watermill on the river near Sturminster Marshall, is owned by the National Trust and open to the public.

Literary associations
Thomas Hardy wrote about Overlooking the River Stour, while William Barnes similarly referenced the "darksome pools o' stwoneless Stour" in his The Water Crowvoot.

The Stour also appears in more occasional fashion in The Faerie Queene.

See also
List of rivers of the United Kingdom

References

Bibliography

Rivers of Dorset
Rivers of Wiltshire
Rivers of Bournemouth
Rivers of Christchurch, Dorset
Wimborne Minster